The 2007–08 Armenian Hockey League season was the seventh season of the Armenian Hockey League, the top level of ice hockey in Armenia. Five teams participated in the league, and Urartu Yerevan won the championship.

Standings

External links
 Season on SFRP'S Hockey Archive

Armenian Hockey League
2007 in Armenian sport
2008 in Armenian sport
Armenian Hockey League seasons